Agnaldo is a masculine given name. People with the name include:

 Agnaldo (footballer, born 1975), Brazilian footballer
 Agnaldo (footballer, born 1978), Brazilian footballer
 Agnaldo Liz (born 1968), Brazilian footballer and manager
 Agnaldo Moraes (born 1994), Brazilian footballer
 Agnaldo Nunes (born 1976), Brazilian boxer
 Agnaldo Rayol (born 1938), Brazilian singer and actor
 Agnaldo Timóteo (1936–2021), Brazilian singer and politician

Masculine given names